Raimonds Vējonis (born 15 June 1966) is a Latvian politician who served as the 9th President of Latvia from 2015 to 2019 and the president of the Latvian Basketball Association since 2020.

He is a member of the Latvian Green Party, part of the Union of Greens and Farmers. He served as Minister of Environmental Protection and Regional Development in 2002 and in 2011 and as Minister of the Environment from 2003 to 2011, while the Ministry of Regional Development was a separate department. He became Minister of Defence of Latvia in 2014 and held that office until becoming president in 2015. Since 2020 he is the president of  Latvian Basketball Association.

Early life and career
Vējonis was born on 15 June 1966 in Pskov Oblast to a Latvian father and a Russian mother, while his father was serving in the Soviet army there. He grew up in Sarkaņi and attended school in the nearby town of Madona. Vējonis became interested in environmental protection because his grandfather had been blinded by chemicals used on a Soviet collective farm.

He graduated from Faculty of Biology of the University of Latvia in 1989 and obtained a master's degree from it in 1995. During his studies he worked as a biology teacher in Madona. From 1989 to 1996 he was deputy director of Madona Regional Environmental board. He was a member of Madona city council from 1990 to 1993. From 1996 to 2002 he was director of Greater Riga Regional Environmental board, during this period he also was a board member in Skulte port and served as state representative at Getliņi Eko waste management company.

Political career
In 2002 Vējonis became Minister of Environmental Protection and Regional Development.

He was elected as President of Latvia on 3 June 2015, receiving the votes of 55 of the 100 members of the Saeima. He used his victory speech to promise to ensure national security, in light of events in Ukraine, while protecting the environment. He became the first head of state in the European Union to be a member of a green party.

Post-presidency 
In January 2020, Vējonis was elected to a four-year term as president of the Latvian Basketball Association by a wide margin.

Personal life 
In 1986, he married Iveta Vējone, a teacher and former first lady. The couple have two sons, Ivo and Nauris. 

Vējonis is a Baltic pagan. He speaks fluent Russian and decent English in addition to Latvian.

Health problems
On 18 January 2016 Vējonis was hospitalized. He was first transported to the Toxicology and Sepsis Clinic of the Riga East Clinical University Hospital branch Gaiļezers, but a day later was transferred to the Latvian Cardiology Center at Pauls Stradiņš Clinical University Hospital. The press counselor of the president initially did not disclose the nature of the illness and suggested that the president had a viral infection. However independent medical experts theorized that Vējonis probably had an infective endocarditis. On January 20 Vējonis underwent emergency open heart surgery to eliminate the source of infection in which the heart valve damaged by sepsis was replaced with an artificial heart valve. Later on unnamed sources told the press that the illness was likely caused by untreated tonsillitis, the press counselor of the president, while still refusing to disclose exact diagnosis, confirmed that the president had been having issues with his throat and his voice had been very hoarse.

Vējonis left hospital on February 26 to undergo physical therapy at National Rehabilitation Center "Vaivari". He was reported to be doing some work during his illness, but fully resumed his official duties on 30 March after spending more than two months recovering.

Honours 
National Honours
 : (Former Grand Master) and Commander Grand Cross with Chain of the Order of the Three Stars (8 July 2015).
 : (Former Grand Master) and Grand Cross of the Order of Viesturs
 : Former Grand Master of the Cross of Recognition
Foreign Honours
 : Collar of the Order of the Cross of Terra Mariana (2 April 2019)
 : Grand Cross special class of the  Order of Merit of the Federal Republic of Germany (22 February 2019)
 : Grand cross with Collar of the Order of the Falcon (16 November 2018)
 : Knight Grand Cross with Collar of the Order of Merit of the Italian Republic (26 June 2018)
 : Knight Grand Cross of the Order of the Netherlands Lion (11 June 2018).
 : The First Class of the Order of Prince Yaroslav the Wise (22 November 2018).

References

|-

|-

|-

1966 births
Living people
People from Pskov Oblast
Latvian modern pagans
Latvian people of Russian descent
Latvian Green Party politicians
Presidents of Latvia
Ministers of Defence of Latvia
Ministers of the Environment of Latvia
Deputies of the 9th Saeima
Deputies of the 10th Saeima
Deputies of the 11th Saeima
Deputies of the 12th Saeima
University of Latvia alumni
Recipients of the Order of Prince Yaroslav the Wise, 1st class
Knights Grand Cross with Collar of the Order of Merit of the Italian Republic
Recipients of the Collar of the Order of the Cross of Terra Mariana
Grand Crosses Special Class of the Order of Merit of the Federal Republic of Germany
Recipients of the Order of the Falcon
Recipients of the Order of the Netherlands Lion